Guam elects on the territorial level a governor and a legislature with the governor elected for a four-year term by the people. The Legislature of Guam has fifteen members elected at large in an open primary for two year terms.

The island also holds both Democratic and Republican presidential caucuses every election year, and conducts a presidential straw poll to coincide with the U.S. general election, even though Guam's votes do not officially count in presidential races.

Guam has a multi-party system, with two strong parties.

Latest elections

2014 general election

Republican Eddie Calvo was re-elected governor with 64% of the vote. Democrats retained control of the island's legislature.

2016 presidential election

Hillary Clinton received nearly 60% of the vote in Guam's Democratic Primary, yielding her nine out of the island's 12 delegates. Donald Trump won all of Guam's nine delegates in the GOP caucus.

Clinton won the straw poll conducted in November. It was the first time since 1984 that Guam's straw poll failed to predict the results of the electoral vote on the mainland.

2016 House election

Madeleine Bordallo was re-elected as Guam's nonvoting delegate to the U.S. House of Representatives.

2016 legislative election

Democrats retained control of Guam's legislature.

2018 general election

Democratic Former Senator and Former Bank of Guam President Lou Leon Guerrero was elected as the first female governor with 50% of the vote. Democrats retained control of the island's legislature.

2018 House election

Michael San Nicolas was elected as Guam's nonvoting delegate to the U.S. House of Representatives.

2018 legislative election

Democrats retained control of Guam's legislature with 10 seats and Republicans got 5 seats.

2020 general election

Joe Biden received nearly 69% of the vote in Guam's Democratic Primary, yielding him five out of the island's nine delegates. Donald Trump won all of Guam's nine delegates in the GOP caucus.

Biden won the straw poll conducted in November before the states picked up 270 to win.

2020 House election

Michael San Nicolas was re-elected for as Guam's nonvoting delegate to the U.S. House of Representatives.

2020 legislative election

Democrats retained control of Guam's legislature with 8 seats and Republicans got 7 seats.

2020 local election

Democrats retained control of village mayors with 10 seats and Republicans got 9 seats.

See also
 Electoral calendar
 Electoral system
Political party strength in Guam

External links
 Guam Election Commission